The World Scrabble Championship 1999 was the fifth World Scrabble Championship and was held at the Carlton Crest Hotel, Melbourne, Australia. 

The winner was Joel Wapnick of Canada. This was the second time a player representing Canada has won, the first being when David Boys won in 1995. The 1991 champion, Peter Morris, was also a Canadian but represented the United States.

Eight games were played on each of the first three days with the top two players advancing to a best-of-five finals.

In the first game, Wapnick opened with the bingo CHAPLET and took a 249-60 lead three turns later with the double -double FILTHIER then cruised to a 624-307 victory. Nyman took the second game and Wapnick took the third then got off to an early lead in the fourth before losing a turn when he tried the phony FUROUR. The game remained tight, with both players getting down two bingos, until Wapnick drew the X and DEOXY for 50 to take a one -point lead and take the last tile out of the bag. With Wapnick having multiple places to go out, Nyman was unable to catch him and lost by a single point. Joel Wapnick could now add a world title to his US national title and Canadian title, one of only two players to have won the big three.

Complete Results

Finals
Game 1: Wapnick 624 – Nyman 307
Game 2: Nyman 444 – Wapnick 330
Game 3: Wapnick 462 – Nyman 339
Game 4: Wapnick 403 – Nyman 402

References 

1999
1999 in Australian sport
1990s in Melbourne
November 1999 sports events in Australia